Hotell is a 2013 Swedish drama film written and directed by Lisa Langseth. It was screened in the Contemporary World Cinema section at the 2013 Toronto International Film Festival.

The film received four nominations at the 49th Guldbagge Awards.

Plot
Erika joins a group therapy session after her baby is born with brain damage. The group decides to travel to a series of hotels where they can wake up each day and, as a coping mechanism, be different people.

Cast
 Alicia Vikander as Erika
 David Dencik as Rikard
 Simon J. Berger as Oskar
 Henrik Norlén as Peter
 Philip Martin as Joel
 Mira Eklund as Ann-Sofie
 Anna Bjelkerud as Pernilla

Accolades

References

External links
 
 
 

2013 films
Swedish drama films
Films directed by Lisa Langseth
Films with screenplays by Lisa Langseth
2010s Swedish-language films
2013 drama films
2010s Swedish films